Brennersville is an unincorporated community in Preble County, in the U.S. state of Ohio.

History
Brennersville was founded around 1825 or 1835 (sources vary) by John Brenner, and named for him. A post office called Brennersville was established in 1851, and remained in operation until 1855.

References

Unincorporated communities in Preble County, Ohio
Unincorporated communities in Ohio